Giuseppe Merlin  (20 November 1891 – 7 May 1967) was an Italian light-heavyweight weightlifter. He won the national title in 1919, 1920 and 1925–1927 and placed 16th at the 1924 Summer Olympics.

References

1891 births
1967 deaths
Italian male weightlifters
Olympic weightlifters of Italy
Weightlifters at the 1924 Summer Olympics
20th-century Italian people